Escamps may refer to:

Escamps, Lot, a commune in the French region of Midi-Pyrénées
Escamps, Yonne, a commune in the French region of Bourgogne